The Holy Trinity College of General Santos City is a school in General Santos. It is a non-sectarian school duly registered in the Securities and Exchange Commission, through its Davao City office.  Holy Trinity College of General Santos was established by the Albano Family, as a Pre-school in 1984 and registered as a College in 1989.

History
The school was envisioned in the early 1980s by BGen. Consejo S. Albano and his wife Gertrudes Roxas Trinidad-Albano began as a piano school, then called The Albano Piano School, with lessons conducted by their daughter, Rosalyn T. Albano. With full support from their children, Rey and Marylone Albano, and with financial assistance provided by then Capt. Josemar T. Albano, who was then working overseas as captain on ocean-going vessels, the foundation stone of the school was laid on March 28, 1984, on the occasion of Josemar Albano's birthday.

In 1984, the Holy Trinity Preschool started with 28 children in the family home of the Albanos with Gertrudes as the school head and Rosalyn as the teacher. In 1986, the school opened primary Grades 1-3 and the name of the school was changed to Holy Trinity School. Merlinda Ortega became the first full-time faculty of the school. A parcel of land acquired through the financing of Capt. Josemar Albano allowed the construction of a new building for the primary grades while the original preschool structure was renovated.  Rey Albano also joined his mother and sister in the administration of the school, acting as the school's registrar. In 1987, Grade 4-6 were opened to complete the elementary program with more classrooms built to provide for the demand. The next year, in 1988, the High School Department opened enrolling 196 students for the pioneer batch, thus allowing Holy Trinity School to offer the complete Basic Education program.

SY 1989-1990, the school acquired legal personality as Holy Trinity College of General Santos City Inc. when it was registered with the SEC on May 21, 1990. The following degrees were initially offered:

 Bachelor of Science in Criminology  
 Bachelor in Secondary Education  
 Bachelor in Elementary Education, and  
 Bachelor of Science in Commerce (with the inclusion of Junior Secretarial Course).

The college department started with an enrollment of 124 students with Capt. Josemar T. Albano retired from the seas to become the first president of Holy Trinity College together with BGen. Consejo S. Albano serving as the first Chairman of the Board of Trustees. The school continued to add more college courses to its program offering more learning and job opportunities for the local population.

In 1995, the graduate school was opened initially with two post-undergraduate courses of Master of Arts in Educational Management and Master of Arts in Guidance Counseling.

In 1996, a new four-story building was constructed to accommodate the Basic Education students and to allow for the creation of many facilities including the library and laboratories. A two-story building was also constructed to serve as a centralized comfort room for the students and staff.

In 1997, Capt. Josemar T. Albano stepped down as president to become the Vice President for Administration to focus on his law studies. He relinquished his position to BGen. Consejo S. Albano, Ed.D.

In 2001, another building was erected to house the chapel, canteen, as well as more classrooms and laboratories.

Courses offered
In accordance with CHED Memo Order #41 Series of 2008, Holy Trinity College of General Santos has been recognized by the Institutional Quality Assurance through Monitoring and Evaluation (IQuAME) of the Commission on Higher Education (Philippines) (CHED) as a Developing Institution in the Philippines. The college courses are also accredited by ACSCU-AAI.

Graduate School Programs 

 Master of Science in Criminal Justice with Specialization in Criminology Education
 Master of Arts in Education (Accredited Level II)
 Educational Management
 Educational Administration
 English
 Filipino
 Mathematics
 Physical Education
 Post-Baccalaureate Diploma in Alternative Learning System

College of Arts and Sciences 

 Bachelor of Arts in Communication
 Bachelor of Arts (Accredited Level II)
 Community Development
 English Language Study
 Political Science
 Bachelor of Science in Exercise in Sports Science
 Fitness and Sports Management

College of Business Management and Accountancy 

 Bachelor of Science in Accountancy
 Bachelor of Science in Accounting Information System
 Bachelor of Science in Accounting Technology
 Bachelor of Science in Business Administration (Accredited Level II)
 Financial Management
 Marketing Management
 Human Resource Development Management
 Bachelor of Science in Hospitality Management
 Bachelor of Science in Management Accounting
 Bachelor of Science in Office Management
 Bachelor of Science in Office Administration
 Office Management
 Bachelor of Science in Tourism Management

College of Engineering and Technical Education 

 Associate in Computer Technology
 Bachelor of Science in Computer Engineering
 Bachelor of Science in Computer Science
 Bachelor of Science in Information Technology

College of Criminal Justice Education 

 Bachelor of Science in Criminology (Accredited Level II)
 Bachelor of Science in Criminology-ETEEAP
 Bachelor of Forensic Science
 Bachelor in Industrial Security Management

College of Teacher Education 

 Bachelor of Elementary Education (Accredited Level III)
 Bachelor of Culture and Arts Education
 Bachelor of Science in Exercise in Sports Science
 Fitness and Sports and Management
 Bachelor of Physical Educations
 School P.E.
 Sports and Wellness Management
 Bachelor of Secondary Education (Accredited Level II)
 English
 Filipino
 Mathematics
 Science
 Bachelor of Technical-Vocational Education
 Computer Programming
 Electrical Technology
 Food Service Management
 Bachelor of Technology and Livelihood Technology (BTLEd)
 Home Economics
 Information and Communication Technology

School of Tech-Voch Education and Training (TVET) Programs 

 Automotive Servicing NC I
 Automotive Servicing NC II
 Bartending NC II
 Bread and Pastry Production NC II
 Bookkeeping NC III
 Carpentry NC II
 Computer System Servicing NC II (with STAR Award)
 Cookery NC II
 Driving NC II
 Electrical Installation and Maintenance NC II
 Electrical Installation and Maintenance NC III
 Electronics Product Assembly Servicing NC III
 Food and Beverages Services NC II
 Housekeeping NC II
 Masonry NC I
 Masonry NC II
 Shielded Metal Arc Welding NC I
 Shielded Metal Arc Welding NC II

Diploma Courses (PQF 5) 

 Diploma in Computer Engineering
 Diploma in Computer Engineering Technology
 Diploma in Tourism Management

People
 Gerald Anderson,  Filipino-American film and television actor, commercial model, and TV producer. He also played for the high school basketball varsity team of Holy Trinity College of General Santos City, where he was named MVP of an interschool tournament participated by most of the high schools in the Soccsksargen area.

References

http://www.htcgsc.edu.ph/

Educational institutions established in 1984
1984 establishments in the Philippines
Universities and colleges in General Santos